Zhang Shuai defeated wildcard Dayana Yastremska in the final, 3–6, 6–3, 6–4 to win the Singles title at the 2022 WTA Lyon Open. It was her first title since 2017. Yastremska was participating in her first event since fleeing her native country of Ukraine due to the 2022 Russian invasion of Ukraine.

Clara Tauson was the defending champion, but chose not to participate.

Seeds

Draw

Finals

Top half

Bottom half

Qualifying

Seeds

Qualifiers

Lucky loser

Qualifying draw

First qualifier

Second qualifier

Third qualifier

Fourth qualifier

Fifth qualifier

Sixth qualifier

References

External links 
Main draw  
Qualifying draw

2022 Singles
Lyon Open Singles